Rewari metalwork refers to the metallurgy practised by the native people of the city of Rewari, India. The items produced are commonly made of brass, and are often possessed with cultural and utilitarian value. The practice is known to have been in place as early as the 16th century.

History and origin 

The Rewari metal craft industry is about 450 years old, with origins around the Mughal period. This place was known to have a nursery of soldiers since Vedic times, which still exists till date. Hemu, of Rewari who has been proved to be a great warrior in history, belonged to this place. Hemu fought and won 22 wars, without losing any against Afghan rebels and the Mughals to prevent them from capturing Delhi can be described as the Father of Brass Industry in Rewari.

Babur had invaded India in 1526 and used brass cannons in the First Battle of Panipat, for the first time in this part of the world.  This was the time when Hemu, who was dealing in food items till then, set up brass foundries to manufacture cannons in Rewari, to make supplies to the then Indian ruler Sher Shah Suri with whom he had close contacts. Hemu took technological help from Portuguese in manufacturing brass cannons and production of saltpetre used to make gunpowder. With the help of these supplies of brass cannons and saltpetre, that Sher Shah Suri could defeat Babur's son Humanyun in 1539, and force him to retreat to Kabul. Brass cannons had become an all-important war tool by that time.

Slowly as demand for brass utensils, especially for water carrying and storage, developed in this area and was supplied throughout the country from Rewari. The whole region lying at the border of Rajasthan and Haryana had scarcity of potable sweet water. There is no river and the underground water available in the region was brackish and Rewari was the only region nearby which had sweet drinkable water due to the presence of four huge lakes or "bawadis" there. Rain water was the only source of drinkable water. It was collected in the lakes and wells were dug around the lakes to get clean water. People from the nearby places used to come to take water. Clay pitchers were replaced by metal containers as copper ore was available in nearby Khetri in Rajasthan.

Rewari became regional centre of sheet metalwork and craftsmen skilled in this work flourished in Rewari. The basic purpose that led to the initiation of the craft was storage of water hence big and small utensils "bartans" were made like kund or "tamdi," metal pitchers or "tokani," "parati," "patili" and "bhagonas."

Customs associated with the craft 

Some local customs developed with the brass craft in which, during a marriage a boy used to gift the girl’s family a kund (sicsic) and the girl’s family used to give 11, 21, or 51 brass utensils as dowry.  Till date every marriage that takes place within 50 km of the city these ceremonies are performed and the brass utensils are supplied from the Rewari Mandi only.

As the demand was not much in early times, the brass raw material needed for the craft was supplied by the local scrap melting factories. But gradually as the demand for utensils and industrial sheets increased, large industries were set up in the region which supplied sheet brass to the craftsmen. Today there are big setups in the region providing the raw material among which Aggarwal Metal Works Pvt Ltd., Gupta Metal Works Pvt. Ltd., Bharat Metal Works, Everest Metals are the most important ones.

Nature of the products 
The entire product range made in Rewari is utility based rather than being aesthetically gratifying. Since the origin of the craft is need-based, hence the products also are purely utilitarian with very little emphasis on aesthetics. Going back to the history where the need of storage and transportation erupted the products made cater to the function of storing, cooking, and transporting. Initially the products made were restricted to keeping water but since time cooking pots and plates have also started to be made.

Product range 
The product range of the Rewari metalcraft is as follows:
1.	Tokni: Tokni is a metal pitcher most significant to the craft. It is supposedly one of the first things that started the metal craft.
2.	Patili or Dekchi: It is another container which resembles a Tokni but the height is less than half of a Tokni. It is quite broad compared to the height of the utensil. It is mainly used for cooking vegetables, preparation of tea, etc.
3.	Parati or Parat: parat or parati, as it is called in the local term, is a huge plate with raised peripheral walls.
4.	Kund or Nand: This is a huge cylindrical tank used to store water. The kund is often kept in a pit dug in the ground to keep the water more cool.

Raw materials 
	Suhaga  or borax
	Acid – tejab
	Khatai / tamarind
	Sand paper 24 no.
	Brass wire
	Metal sheet
	Coal

The basic raw materials used in the practicing of the craft are brass and copper sheets. Other than this to join the shaped pieces of various utensils soldering materials "suhaga" (it is a mixture of borax and water used to join metal pieces), brass, copper and zinc are used. Industries mainly copper & brass rolling mills are continuously producing best quality coils, strips, sheets, plates, and circles by the hot rolling and cold rolling methods.

There are many manufacturers associated with copper and brass.

Another process that involves washing of the utensil requires sulphuric acid, followed by washing in tamarind. Other than this coke or coal is required to heat up the utensils during shaping to make it soft.

Sourcing and recycling 
Some shopkeepers in the area act as a channel between the craftsmen and the brass factories and supply them with brass and copper sheets. The thickness of the sheet is approx 36–40 gauge.
Also during working with the sheet, circular patterns are cut on the rectangular sheet. The waste edges are collected, melted in a furnace bhatti, converted in the form of bricks and sold back to the factory at the same rate of purchase.
The furnace used in this case is an open furnace and uses coal as the ignition material.
There are about 10 furnaces in the region kayastwada where all the local craftsmen bring their waste metal and process it into bricks.

Tools 
	Hammer - There are 4 different sizes of hammer used in the initial process. Among them, one is made of iron called hathori and other three are wooden hammers called as ghanchla. The wood used is of Ronj tree found in and around the area.
	Dies – The dies are made of iron; the circular brass sheets are kept on the dies and after hammering the desired depth or volume is achieved on the sheet.
	Welding – Gas welding is done.
	Chowka and Megh – These are made of iron. It is used to make the design on the utensil. The get the desired design on the utensil it is kept on the chowka or megh and the hammer is stroked on the metal surface.
	Lakdi – It is a wooden piece used to give a shine to the hammer so that when it strikes metal a shine produced there, too. The lakdi is the root of aankda tree.
	Powder – The powder is put on to this lakdi.
	Misc— Cut tyre tubes are worn on the feet to protect from metal edges. Rubber gloves are worn while washing the utensils with acid.

Process 
The steps followed on the round cut brass sheet are almost the same for making tokni, patili and parati. The only difference lies in the dies used and the welding of the pieces.
The basic steps can be summed up as under:

1.	Hammering on the die: Different dies made of iron are used for giving the brass sheets, the basic shape of the product. Two dies are used for making the three basic pieces of tokni and dekchi; and one for making the only piece for parati. Heavy wood hammers are used in the initial stage and later on detailed finish is given by smaller metal hammers. Craftsmen wear hand and toe leather caps for protection.

2.	Joining the joints: Borax powder, commonly known as suhaaga mixed in lukewarm water, for making a thick paste. The pieces to be joined are then placed edge to edge touching each other and this paste is applied on the joints.  Its then kept in the sun and allowed to dry.

3.	Brazing / Welding: Gas welding is then done on the joint, above the dried paste, using brass welding wires.

4.	Acid wash: The prepared product is now washed with Gandhak ki tezab so as to remove all the dust and other dirt particles from the surface of the metal.

5.	Washing in water: The acid washed utensil is now washed thoroughly with water to remove the acid which can corrode the metal on prolonged exposure.

6.	Neutralization: after water  washing acid is not completely removed. So to neutralize the surface of the metal it is dipped into Kishta or Khatai i.e. tamarind solution.acid present on the meta surface darken the color of brass due to corrosion.

7.	Polishing: Polishing the metal surface is done mainly by hand. The metal surface is  smoothed by rubbing it with 24 number, coarse Regmar and sand-Balu ki ret. The surface now gets the golden yellow colour of brass.

8.	Decoration by hammering: Final finish is done by using a metal hammer. Metal surface is stroked from one side and the impressions come even on the other side, too. This is done mainly for serving two purposes. First is to strengthen the metal surface by increasing the density and second is for decoration, so as to make the product more visually appealing.

Craft and craftsmen 
All the craftsmen who are working on brass belong to the "Thatera" or "Khasera" community and if they employ work under them they are also take from the same community.  Their roots originally lie in Kishangarh, Rajasthan. The work is generally inherited from father to son and does not require any training. The process of manufacturing is not complicated and there in no division of labor involved. The whole process of making a utensil excluding its finishing and hammering is completed by one craftsman. Even for the other process like washing, sanding and hammering the family members are enough to help the craftsman complete the product. In Rewari the metal craft is concentrated in the "thateragaon" or "kayastwada." They are generally not well-off financially.

Workspace and setup 
The setup of the craft requires no special work setup. The craftsmen in the region sit in front of their houses and also one or two rooms in the house are kept for working purposes. In front of many houses dies are permanently fixed in the ground.

Peak and off season 
The peak seasons for the selling of the utensils are near Diwali, Navratra and Teej festivals.
June to mid October is supposed to be the time of the year when the business is very slow. It is this time when the selling of the utensils is rather a retarded affair and the craftsmen who are a little well off than the others generally keep making the utensils and stocking them so as to release the bulk in the selling season.

Strengths 
	Storing water in brass utensils is good for health. It combines copper and zinc together. Copper is very good for health the properties of which are in brass also.
	The craft has its root in the glorious history of Rewari which gives its identity to it.
	The resale value of brass is high as compared to the other metals. If it is bought at Rs 250/- per kg then the resale value is more or less near to it which is not in the case of say steel.

Weaknesses 
	The raw material (the metal sheet) has become so costly that craftsmen cannot afford to buy in bulk. The rate of brass in 1986 was around Rs. 40/- per kg. This has risen to about Rs.250/- per kg without the considerable increase in the labor cost of the craftsmen. It makes it very difficult for the craftsmen to sustain the craft and which is one of the major reasons for many of the craftsmen quitting the work.
	The craftsmen do not get satisfactory amount as a return on their labor. They rate at which they are paid only depends mainly on the quality of the brass they are using. Workmanship is not that great a deal when it comes to pay the craftsmen. On an average they are paid Rs.40/- per kg additional on the utensils while selling. Considering the fact that one craftsman makes one "Tokni" in a day which weighs nearly about a kilogram, Rs. 40 will not obviously get him his bread and butter.
	In the marketing of the product, there is a two tier system. One craftsman and other local dealers. Normally these craftsmen sell their products to the local dealers at cheap rates because it is very convenient for the craftsperson as it skips going to the main market to sell the products themselves or to approach various shopkeepers. It also saves money in transportation. These middle men are the ones who actually take all the profit by selling these products further on at high prices. Because of this the artisans are underpaid.
	Most of the craftsmen cannot make and store the product because they are not financially strong. As such there in no active government policy aiding these craftspeople financially to provide them raw materials. This results in slow production of goods and the artisans actually suffer in the peak season where they do not have stocked utensils to make money.

Threats 
	Aluminum and steel is taking over brass utensils. The reason being that they are more cheap and readily available everywhere.
	Cost is more compared to other utensils available in the market.
	With more and more exposure of other markets brass work in Rewari is facing huge competitions from Moradabad where brass work is being carried on at a grand scale. Rewari metal work might not be available in Moradabad but metal work from Moradabad is readily available everywhere even in Rewari.

References

Rewari
Economic history of India